Denise Klecker (born 26 January 1972 in Mainz, Rhineland-Palatinate) is a retired female field hockey defender from Germany, who won the gold medal with the German National Women's Team at the 2004 Summer Olympics in Athens, Greece. She is renowned as specialist for penalty corner shooting.

International senior tournaments
 1995 – European Nations Cup, Amstelveen (3rd place)
 1995 – Champions Trophy, Mar del Plata (4th place)
 1995 – Olympic Qualifying Tournament, Cape Town (3rd place)
 1997 – Champions Trophy, Berlin (2nd place)
 1998 – Indoor European Nations Cup, Orense (1st place)
 1998 – World Cup, Utrecht (3rd place)
 1999 – European Nations Cup, Cologne (2nd place)
 2000 – Olympic Qualifying Tournament, Milton Keynes (3rd place)
 2000 – Champions Trophy, Amstelveen (2nd place)
 2000 – Summer Olympics, Sydney (7th place)
 2002 – Indoor European Nations Cup, France (1st place)
 2002 – World Cup, Perth (7th place)
 2003 – Indoor World Cup, Leipzig (1st place)
 2003 – Champions Challenge, Catania (1st place)
 2003 – European Nations Cup, Barcelona (3rd place)
 2004 – Summer Olympics, Athens (1st place)

External links
 Profile on Hockey Olympica
 
 

1972 births
Living people
German female field hockey players
Olympic field hockey players of Germany
Olympic gold medalists for Germany
Olympic medalists in field hockey
Field hockey players at the 2000 Summer Olympics
Field hockey players at the 2004 Summer Olympics
Medalists at the 2004 Summer Olympics
Sportspeople from Mainz
21st-century German women